Sigma Tau Delta is an international excelled English  honor society for students of English at four-year colleges and universities who are within the top 30% of their class and have a 3.5 GPA or higher.  It presently has over 850 chapters in the United States and abroad. The organization inducts over 9,000 new members annually, and is the largest honors organization in its field and one of the largest members of the Association of College Honor Societies (ACHS).

Sigma Tau Delta's central purpose is to confer distinction for high achievement in English language, literature, and writing, and the organization is dedicated to fostering literacy and all aspects of the discipline of English. The Society offers its members tens of thousands of dollars in scholarships, internships, grants, and awards, as well as publication opportunities in its journals The Rectangle and The Sigma Tau Delta Review. Annually the Society provides an international convention, where over 1,000 students and faculty participate in scholarly and creative paper presentations, workshops, and roundtables, and hear featured speakers such as Ursula K. Le Guin, Neil Gaiman, and Poets Laureate Kay Ryan and Natasha Trethewey.

Sigma Tau Delta also sponsors the National English Honor Society (NEHS), currently with over 600 chapters, which serves students and faculty in high schools throughout the U.S. and abroad.

The Society's central office is located at Northern Illinois University in DeKalb, Illinois.

History
A group of professors developed a national constitution and ritual in preparation for expansion as a national organization, with Fadner contributing the Ritual and Owen the original constitution. At this first convention the first twelve chapters were installed, the insignia and regalia was formally adopted, and the Society's publication, The Rectangle was established.

Founders
 Prof. Judson Quincy Owen (Dakota Wesleyan)
 Prof. Frederic Fadner (Lombard College)
 Prof. P.C. Sommerville (Dakota Wesleyan)

The society has grown swiftly through its first hundred years, having established over 850 chapters. It is one of the largest member organizations of the ACHS.

Literary honor society Lambda Iota Tau went dormant in 2016-2017, with many members joining Sigma Tau Delta.

Organization
Sigma Tau Delta is divided into six regions: Eastern, Far Western, High Plains, Midwestern, Southern, and Southwestern.  Each region has three elected regional officials: a Regent, a Student Representative, and an Associate Student Representative.

The Regents are voting members of the Board of Directors, which also includes the society President, Immediate Past President, Vice-President/President-Elect, Historian, Treasurer, and two Student Advisors.

Serving the Board of Directors in a non-voting capacity are the Executive Director, Director of Communications and Chapter Development, Editor of Publications, Student Representatives, Alumni Representative, Web Facilitators, Business Manager, Project Coordinator, and NEHS Director.

Membership
Student membership is available to students currently enrolled in four-year colleges and universities that have active chapters; applications are submitted through the student's local chapter.
Candidates for undergraduate membership must have completed at least three semesters or five quarters of college work and a minimum of two college courses in English language or literature beyond the usual requirements in freshman English. They must also have a minimum of a B or equivalent grade point average in English and must rank at least in the highest 35 percent of their class in general scholarship. (Local chapters may raise, but not lower, these criteria.)
Candidates for graduate membership must be enrolled in a graduate program in English or one of its specializations, have completed six semester hours of graduate work or the equivalent, and have a minimum grade point average of 3.3 on a 4.0 scale.

Conventions
The Society organizes a convention every year in March, at which members present original fiction, poetry, critical essays, and personal non-fiction. Workshops and roundtable discussions are presented by members and guest experts. Attendees also hear keynote presentations and readings and attend workshops, Q&A sessions, and book signings by featured speakers such as Ursula K. Le Guin, Neil Gaiman, and Poets Laureate Kay Ryan and Natasha Trethewey.

Recent international conventions have been held in St. Louis, MO (2010), Pittsburgh, PA (2011), New Orleans, LA (2012), Portland, OR (2013), Savannah, GA (2014), Albuquerque, NM (2015), Minneapolis, MN (2016), Louisville, KY (2017), Cincinnati, OH (2018), and St. Louis, MO (2019). At the 2013 Convention in Portland, nearly 550 papers were presented and over $10,000 was awarded for student works presented at the convention. Another $60,000+ was awarded for various other scholarships and writing awards. This year's convention location is Las Vegas, NV (March 25-March 28, 2020).

The National English Honor Society (NEHS)
The National English Honor Society (NEHS) is sponsored by Sigma Tau Delta. It currently has over 600 chapters in high schools in the United States and abroad. High schools can petition for a local chapter. Individuals may be inducted through these chapters as a member of NEHS.

The NEHS awards over $30,000 in scholarships annually.

References

External links
 Sigma Tau Delta: The International English Honor Society

Association of College Honor Societies
Honor societies
Student organizations established in 1924
1924 establishments in South Dakota